Panaeolus foenisecii, commonly called the mower's mushroom, haymaker or brown hay mushroom, is a very common and widely distributed little brown mushroom often found on lawns and is not an edible mushroom.   In 1963 Tyler and Smith found that this mushroom contains serotonin, 5-HTP and 5-hydroxyindoleacetic acid. In many field guides it is listed as psychoactive; however, the mushroom does not produce any hallucinogenic effects.

Description 
Cap: 1 to 3 cm across, conic to convex, chestnut brown to tan, hygrophanous, often with a dark band around the margin which fades as the mushroom dries.
Gills: Broad, adnate, brown with lighter edges, becoming mottled as the spores mature.
Stipe: 3 to 8 cm by 1 to 3 mm, fragile, hollow, beige to light brown, fibrous, pruinose, and slightly striate.
Taste: A slightly unpleasant nutty fungal taste.
Odor: Nutty, slightly unpleasant.
Spore print: Dark walnut brown.
Microscopic features: Spores measure 12–17 x 7–11 μm, subfusoid to lemon shaped, rough, dextrinoid, with an apical germ pore. Cheilocystidia subfusoid to cylindric or subcapitate, often wavy, up to 50 μm long. Pleurocystidia absent, but some authors report inconspicuous "pseudocystidia". The pileipellis a cellular cuticle with subglobose elements and has pileocystidia.

Habitat
The species may be the most common to appear in lawns in the Pacific Northwest. It is also found on lawns along the east coast.

Gallery
The following two images are of Panaeolus foenisecii in the wild with two magnifications of the spore print.

Similar species
Similar species include Agaricus campestris, Conocybe apala, Marasmius oreades, Psathyrella candolleana, and Psathyrella gracilis.

It is sometimes mistaken for the psychedelic Panaeolus cinctulus or Panaeolus olivaceus, both of which share the same habitat and can be differentiated by their jet black spores. This is probably why Panaeolus foenisecii is occasionally listed as a psychoactive species in older literature.

See also

List of Panaeolus species

References

External links
 Mushroom Expert – Panaeolus foenisecii
 Mykoweb – Panaeolus foenisecii
 Mushroom Observer – Panaeolus foenisecii at mushroomobserver.org
 Rough Spored Panaeoloideae spore comparison

Bolbitiaceae
Fungi of Europe
Fungi described in 1933
Inedible fungi
Taxa named by Christiaan Hendrik Persoon